Syahrul Azwari bin Ibrahim (born 12 January 1993) is a Malaysian footballer who last played as a right winger for Malaysian club Kedah. He represented Malaysia U-23 in the 2011 VFF Cup and scored 1 goal. With the U-23 team, he also won the gold medal in 2011 Southeast Asian Games football tournament, where he scored the winning goal against hosts Indonesia in the group stage.

He made his debut for the senior national team in late 2015, with 2 substitute appearances in 2018 FIFA World Cup qualification matches against Palestine and United Arab Emirates.

Club career

Sarawak FA
On 20 February 2016, Syahrul was confirmed as Sarawak FA player on loan from Kelantan FA for 2016 season. According to the Secretary-general of the Football Association of Malaysia, Hamidin Mohd Amin, both Kelantan Football Association and Football Association of Sarawak has reached an agreement that Syahrul will join Sarawak FA as part of a loan deal.

The saga started when the disbanded of Harimau Muda and all players were instructed to join their home teams but they could also join other teams if the home teams did not want them. Syahrul signed for Sarawak FA in December 2015, despite being offered to return to Kelantan FA according to the Kelantan FA head coach, K. Devan. However, in January, the Football Association of Malaysia Players Status Committee made a decision that Syahrul must play for Kelantan and they must negotiate on new terms and conditions of his contract. However, both parties failed to agree terms, and Sarawak FA finally held talks with Kelantan FA about signing up Syahrul, resulting in a loan deal.

Career statistics

Club

International

International goals

Malaysia U23

Honours

Club
Kedah 
 Malaysia FA Cup: 2019

International
Malaysia U23
 Southeast Asian Games (1): 2011

References

External links
 
 

1993 births
Living people
Malaysian footballers
People from Kelantan
Malaysia international footballers
Association football forwards
Malaysian people of Malay descent
Southeast Asian Games gold medalists for Malaysia
Southeast Asian Games medalists in football
Melaka United F.C. players
Competitors at the 2011 Southeast Asian Games
Kelantan United F.C. players